Malangali is an administrative ward in Ileje District, Songwe Region, Tanzania. , the ward had a total population of 10,066.

References

Wards of Songwe Region